Walter Anthony Huston (born April 16, 1950) is an American actor, writer, and assistant director.

Biography
He was born in Los Angeles County, California, the son of director John Huston and his fourth wife Enrica Soma. 

His siblings include Anjelica, Allegra and Danny Huston.   

Unlike other members of his family, who went into acting, Huston specialized in writing screenplays. He is known for his work on The Hellcats (1968) and The Dead (1987). He later became an attorney and assistant director.

On 18 November 1978, he married Lady Margot Cholmondeley, the daughter of The 6th Marquess of Cholmondeley, with whom he had three children: Mathew (born 1979), Laura Sybil (born 1981), and actor Jack Huston (born 1982). Huston and Lady Margot later divorced.

Accolades

Filmography
The List of Adrian Messenger (1963) (Derek Bruttenholm) (as Walter Anthony Huston)
The Eye Creatures (1967) (Culver's sergeant) (as Tony Houston)
Zontar, the Thing from Venus (1967) (Keith Ritchie) (as Anthony Houston)
Sam (as Anthony Houston)
Curse of the Swamp Creature (1968) (Tom) (as Tony Houston)
Mars Needs Women (1968) (Martian fellow #3) (as Anthony Houston)
Comanche Crossing (1968)
Apple's Way (1974) (man/man at perfume counter)
The Runaways (1975) (marine driver)
The Dead (1987) (screenwriter; nominated for an Academy Award)

References

External links

1950 births
American male actors
Tony
Living people